Eliza Patricia Dushku (born December 30, 1980) is an American actress. She is best known for starring as Faith in the supernatural drama series Buffy the Vampire Slayer (1998–2003) and its spin-off series Angel (2000–2003). She also had lead roles in the Fox supernatural drama series Tru Calling (2003–2005) and the Fox science fiction series Dollhouse (2009–2010), for which she was a producer.

Dushku had starring roles in various films, including True Lies (1994), Bye Bye Love (1995), Bring It On (2000), Jay and Silent Bob Strike Back (2001), The New Guy (2002), Wrong Turn (2003), On Broadway (2007), The Scribbler (2014), Jane Wants a Boyfriend (2015), and Eloise (2016). She has also done voice work for numerous video games and animated films.

Early life
Dushku was born in Boston, Massachusetts, the only daughter and youngest of the four children of school teacher and administrator Philip Richard George Dushku and Judy Dushku ( Rasmussen), a political science professor. Dushku's father was Boston-born, of Albanian heritage, with his parents coming from the city of Korçë, and her mother, from Idaho, is of Danish, English, Irish and German descent. Her parents were divorced before she was born.

Dushku's mother was a member of the Church of Jesus Christ of Latter-day Saints, and Dushku and her three brothers were raised as Mormons. She attended Beaver Country Day School in Chestnut Hill, Massachusetts, and graduated from Watertown High School.

Career

Acting

1992–1997: Beginnings and breakthrough
Dushku came to the attention of casting agents when she was ten years old. She was chosen in a five-month search for the lead role of Alice in the 1992 romantic drama film That Night. In 1993, Dushku landed a role as Pearl, alongside Robert De Niro and Leonardo DiCaprio, in the drama film This Boy's Life. The following year, she played the teenage daughter of Arnold Schwarzenegger and Jamie Lee Curtis in the action spy film True Lies.

She had roles as Piper Reeves in the short film Fishing with George (1994), as Cat in the television film Journey (1995), as Paul Reiser's daughter in the romantic comedy film Bye Bye Love (1995), and as Cindy Johnson in the comedy drama film Race the Sun (1996).

1998–2002: Buffy the Vampire Slayer and recognition
Dushku planned to attend Suffolk University in Boston, where her mother taught, but her agent asked her to submit a videotape audition for a television show starring another of his clients, Sarah Michelle Gellar. After reading the script, Dushku rushed to a local Claire's to purchase dark makeup and other appropriate accessories for the part of Faith on Buffy the Vampire Slayer. When she began her work on the series, Dushku was still a minor, and had to receive emancipation to work the production's long hours. She later recalled with amusement that the judge who handled her emancipation case, who was an avid fan of the show, jokingly said that she would sign the emancipation order if she could get a signed photo from Dushku. Though initially planned as a three-episode role, the character became so popular that she stayed on for the whole third season and returned for a two-part appearance in season four and for the last five episodes of the series. She also appeared in the spin-off series Angel.

As an unwelcome effect of her portrayal as Faith, Dushku was inundated with fan mail from prisoners. She said:

I've been getting fan mail from maximum security penitentiaries and death row. What are the authorities thinking of in playing a show with young teenage girls to Death Row inmates? They write everything – disgusting things that you don't even want to know about. And they send me pictures – "Oh, here's a picture of me before I was incarcerated!" – and there's some guy sat on the sofa with a bottle of beer and a mustache, and a big gut. It's so creepy. Way more creepy than Buffy.

In 2000, Dushku starred in the hit cheerleader comedy Bring It On. She followed that up with Soul Survivors, which reunited her with her Race the Sun co-star Casey Affleck. In 2001, she appeared in The New Guy with DJ Qualls and in City by the Sea with Robert De Niro and James Franco. The latter film garnered attention from a wider adult audience and several good reviews. The same year, Kevin Smith invited Dushku to be a part of Jay and Silent Bob Strike Back.

2003–2008: Tru Calling and subsequent roles
In 2003, Dushku starred in the horror film Wrong Turn and The Kiss, an independent comedy-drama. Starting that same year, she starred in a new Fox supernatural drama, Tru Calling, where she played the main character, medical student Tru Davies. After having a grant withdrawn, Tru is forced to take a job at a local morgue, where she discovers her power to "re-live" the previous day over again if one of the deceased asks for her help to change what has happened. Dushku turned down a role in a spin-off of Buffy the Vampire Slayer about Faith.

She has had many roles as a "bad girl" in movies. In an interview with Maxim in May 2001, Dushku says of her roles, "It's easy to play a bad girl: You just do everything you've been told not to do, and you don't have to deal with the consequences, because it's only acting."

Dushku starred in the Off-Broadway play Dog Sees God in December 2005. The play was based on the Peanuts comic strip, with Dushku playing a character symbolizing Lucy Van Pelt. She quit in February 2006 along with other members of the cast amid rumors of abuse by the producer, which were later dismissed.

She played the lead character on Nurses, a hospital comedy-drama for Fox. This was the second Fox pilot in which she was cast, but not broadcast. 

She appeared in the Simple Plan music video "I'm Just a Kid" as the band's love interest, as well as Nickelback's video for "Rockstar".

On October 1, 2005, she announced at Wizard World Boston that shooting had begun for Nobel Son in which she would star with Alan Rickman, Danny DeVito, and Bill Pullman. The movie was released at the 2007 Tribeca Film Festival. Another project released in 2007 was On Broadway, an independent movie filmed in Boston. The movie received positive reviews, with a few of them highlighting Dushku's performance.

Dushku has had roles in five video games. She voiced the role of Yumi Sawamura in the English-language version of Yakuza for the PlayStation 2, which was published and developed by Sega, and released in September 2006. Dushku also stars as Shaundi, one of the lead characters in Saints Row 2, which was developed by Volition, Inc. and published by THQ. It was released in North America on October 14, 2008, for the PlayStation 3 and Xbox 360. She was the voice talent for the role of Rubi Malone, the main character in the game WET. She appeared at Spike TV's 2008 Video Game Awards in December 2008. Danielle Nicolet took over the role of Shaundi in Saints Row: The Third. She also voiced Megan McQueen in Champion Mode of the 2011 video game Fight Night Champion.

Variety announced on August 2, 2006, that Dushku would co-star with Macaulay Culkin in Sex and Breakfast, a dark comedy written and directed by Miles Brandman. A reviewer described Dushku as "charming" and giving the character "an edge". The movie was released in Los Angeles on November 30, 2007, and on DVD on January 22, 2008. She starred in Open Graves, a 2008 horror-thriller about a satanic game co-starring Mike Vogel. She played the main character in The Thacker Case and The Alphabet Killer, both thrillers based on real-life events, one of them directed by Rob Schmidt, with whom she had worked on Wrong Turn. Both movies were released in 2008. The Alphabet Killer contains Dushku's first topless scene. The film earned mixed reviews, but reviewers praised Dushku's performance, commenting "Eliza Dushku commands the screen but cannot reconcile the script's conflicted and increasingly idiotic agendas." She appeared in Bottle Shock, a drama about Napa valley wine. The film was directed by Randall Miller, who helmed Nobel Son.

2009–present: Dollhouse and other work
On August 26, 2007, Dushku signed a development deal with Fox Broadcasting Company and 20th Century Fox. Under the pact, the network and the studio would develop projects tailor-made for the actress as well as approach her with existing pitches and scripts.

Subsequently, it was announced on October 31 that Dushku had lured Joss Whedon, of Buffy the Vampire Slayer, back to TV, to create a television series called Dollhouse. Dushku produced the show and played the main character, 'Echo'. It aired on Fox during the 2008–09 TV season. In an interview, Dushku talked about how Dollhouse and her reconnection with Whedon came about:

I invited Joss Whedon to lunch after I did the business deal with Fox. We'd had a cool relationship in the past and I so wanted to do something else, and I wanted to get back into a television show. I had him on the brain for sure but I hadn't called him yet, but I sort of took a leap of faith and set things up with Fox and then called Joss. We went to a four-hour lunch where I just sort of used my womanly wiles. No, we've become such good friends, kind of like brother and sister and kind of like he was my watcher, my handler from when I first moved out to L.A. when I was 17 and I was a little bit of a wild child. He's watched me and helped me and taught me over the years. I told him how bad I wanted and needed him back and he accepted and here we are.

Dushku described Whedon as "my favorite genius ... favorite friend ... big brother ... and the only person out here I've ever wholeheartedly trusted, because he's never let me down." Dollhouse was renewed for a second season. The producers cited their confidence in the strength of Whedon's fan base and high DVR numbers as their reasons for keeping the show. Fox cancelled Dollhouse on November 11, 2009. The show officially wrapped filming on the second and final season on December 16, 2009.

Dushku was the voice actor for contract killer "Rubi Malone" in the action video game Wet.

In 2010, Dushku provided her voice for Noah's Ark: The New Beginning and appeared in the film Locked In. She also guest-starred in an episode of CBS' comedy The Big Bang Theory
which aired on November 4, 2010.
In 2011, Dushku featured alongside Jayson Floyd in "One Shot", a short action clip on YouTube directed by and starring Freddie Wong, released on May 13, 2011.

Dushku had a lead role in the online animated "motion comic" series Torchwood: Web of Lies, based on the BBC series Torchwood: Miracle Day. In June 2012, Dushku starred with Katie Cassidy, Gina Gershon and Michelle Trachtenberg in The Scribbler, directed by John Suits and produced by Gabriel Cowan.

In 2013, she was cast as Patricia Holm in a pilot film for a proposed TV revival series of The Saint, but the series was not commissioned. In July 2017 the pilot was released on digital HD/VOD.

From 2013 to 2015, Dushku voiced the role of She-Hulk in the Disney XD animated series Hulk and the Agents of S.M.A.S.H.. In 2016, she was cast in a recurring role in the fourth season of the Cinemax TV series Banshee. In 2017, she had a recurring guest role in the last three episodes of the first season of the CBS drama series Bull with the option of becoming a series regular in season two.

Production work
In August 2011, Dushku visited Albania with a crew from the Travel Channel and Lonely Planet to film Dear Albania, a documentary promoting tourism in her father's family's country of origin.

Dushku has been CEO of her own production company, Boston Diva Productions, with her brother Nate as a partner.  She secured exclusive rights to make an authorized film based on the life of photographer Robert Mapplethorpe.  At one time provisionally entitled The Perfect Moment, the film was in development over more than a decade. Eventually she enlisted the help of Ondi Timoner and Mapplethorpe, with Matt Smith as the title character, was brought to the screen in 2018.

In 2017, her production company, in association with IM Global Television, was reported to be developing Glen Cook's The Black Company series of books for a television series, with Dushku potentially starring as The Lady.

Personal life
Dushku was raised a Mormon, and still has a Mormon-themed tattoo. She describes herself as having taken a different path from the LDS Church, and is grateful for having grown up in it.

Dushku lived for more than 15 years in Los Angeles, though spending substantial time back in Watertown and Boston in the period before her stepfather died.  She lived for several years in the Laurel Canyon area.

In 2009, she posed nude for the May issue of Allure magazine.

Having originally intended to attend college in Boston, before her big break on Buffy altered those plans, she announced in March 2014 at the Emerald City Comicon that she would be attending college later that year. On June 22, 2014, The Boston Globe reported that Dushku had left Los Angeles, moved back to Watertown near Boston, and was planning to attend college. As of 2016, she was a student at Suffolk University, studying sociology. In 2019, Boston Magazine reported that she was studying holistic psychology at Lesley University. She graduated in 2020. 

She is politically active and campaigned for Bernie Sanders in the U.S. presidential election of 2016.

Relationships
Dushku began dating former Boston Celtics and Los Angeles Lakers basketball player Rick Fox in October 2009, and in August 2010 the couple confirmed that they were living together. It was announced on June 24, 2014, that the pair had split.

In June 2017, she became engaged to businessman Peter Palandjian and they wed on August 18, 2018. In August 2019, Dushku gave birth to the couple's son, Philip Bourne. In February 2021, Dushku announced via Instagram that she was pregnant with her second child. In August 2021, Dushku gave birth to the couple's second son, Bodan.

Activism
Dushku serves on the board of directors of the THRIVE-Gulu organization (The Trauma Healing and Reflection Center in Gulu), an organization dedicated to helping the survivors of war (including former child soldiers) in Northern Uganda, which her mother and stepfather co-founded. She raised US$30,000 for the land for the center's building, and has performed other fundraising activities, as well as helping out in the center itself.

As a role model to campus leaders for her activism, Dushku was invited by the Millennium Campus Network (MCN) as a national keynote speaker and honored as a Global Generation Award winner alongside U.S. Secretary of State John Kerry at MCN events in 2011.

Over several years, Dushku raised funds for Camp Hale, which had been attended by her father and brothers, including some specific campaigning to sustain a new concept of a girls' session at the camp, which was launched in 2012, and which she joined in person.

Albanian citizenship
Dushku visited her father's family and their home city in Albania in 2006 after receiving an invitation from Albanian Prime Minister Sali Berisha. She also visited Kosovo, and got an Albanian Eagle tattoo on the back of her neck. While on her second visit to Albania in 2011, she applied for Albanian citizenship and obtained the Albanian passport and ID Card. Dushku became an honorary citizen of Tirana, and was given the honorary title of Tirana Ambassador of Culture and Tourism in the World by Tirana mayor Lulzim Basha. Additionally, she was given honorary citizen status in her father's home town of Korçë. She and her brother Nate produced a film about a joint visit to Albania, Dear Albania.

Sexual molestation and harassment allegations
In January 2018, Dushku made public an account of having been molested by stunt coordinator Joel Kramer when she was 12 and working on True Lies. She wrote that soon after, an adult friend of Dushku confronted Kramer on set, and that the same day, Dushku was injured during a stunt and several of her ribs were broken, while Kramer was responsible for her safety. Kramer has denied the accusation of sexual misconduct.

In January 2019, CBS made a $9.5 million settlement with Dushku after she was fired from a recurring role on Bull, after informing producers of series lead Michael Weatherly's inappropriate behavior on the set. According to documents from the official mediation, Weatherly was recorded on video making comments about spanking Dushku over his knee, soliciting a threesome, alluding to sexual assault in his "rape van," and other inappropriate remarks. After Dushku spoke with producers, Weatherly texted CBS Television Studios' president David Stapf saying he wanted to talk about Dushku's sense of humor, though Stapf pushed back saying "Ms. Dushku made the show better." Days later, showrunner Glenn Caron terminated Dushku's expected role on the show, despite opposition from studio executives. The settlement amount was calculated to compensate Dushku for her loss of earnings from her planned promotion to series regular, with "well-developed plans" set to make her a regular cast member following her three-episode guest appearance. In December 2018, when the settlement was reported, Weatherly publicly apologized for the comments. Dushku responded that Weatherly broke the terms of their settlement by speaking to the press and characterized his apology as "more deflection, denial, and spin." In November 2021, Dushku testified in front of the House Judiciary Committee about her sexual harassment accusations during her time on Bull.

In February 2021, Dushku shared a message of support for Charisma Carpenter, in reference to allegations of abuse against Buffy creator Joss Whedon.

Health
Dushku has said that she has attention deficit hyperactivity disorder (ADHD). She announced in December 2011 that she switched to a vegan diet after watching the documentary Forks Over Knives. In December 2014, she said she was no longer a vegetarian. On March 7, 2017, Dushku attended a Youth Summit on Opioid Awareness, where she revealed that she was a recovering alcoholic and drug addict, having begun drinking and abusing drugs at the age of 14. She said her addictions were at one point so serious that her brother forbade her from being left alone with her niece, his daughter Sofia, and that she was eight-and-a-half years sober.

Filmography

Film

Television

Video games

Music videos

Awards and nominations

Honors
Dushku was ranked by Maxim magazine as 6th on the "Hot 100 Women of 2009" list. 
Dushku was named Ambassador for the 2012 Consumer Electronics Show Entertainment Matters program in October 2011.

References

External links

1980 births
Living people
20th-century American actresses
21st-century American actresses
Actresses from Boston
Actresses from Los Angeles
Actresses from Massachusetts
American child actresses
American film actresses
American people of Albanian descent
American people of Danish descent
American people of English descent
American people of German descent
American people of Irish descent
American television actresses
American video game actresses
American voice actresses
Disney people
Walt Disney Animation Studios people
Marvel Comics people
People with acquired Albanian citizenship
Former Latter Day Saints
George Washington University alumni
Massachusetts Democrats
People from Watertown, Massachusetts
American women chief executives
Watertown High School (Massachusetts) alumni
Beaver Country Day School alumni
Activists from Boston
Activists from Los Angeles